is a former Japanese football player.

Playing career
Okamoto was born in Izumo on October 16, 1974. After graduating from high school, he joined Japan Football League club Tokyo Gas (later FC Tokyo) in 1993. He played many matches as left side midfielder from first season. The club results rose year by year and won the champions in 1998. The club was promoted to new league J2 League from 1999. On March 14, 1999, he scored a goal in the 4th minute against Sagan Tosu in opening match in 1999 season. This goal is the first ever J2 League goal. Although he played as regular player, he got hurt in summer and his opportunity to play decreased. Although the club won the 2nd place in 1999 and was promoted to J1 League from 2000, he could only play one match. In 2001, he moved to Japan Football League club Yokogawa Electric. Although he played many matches in 2001, he could not play at all in the match in 2002 and retired in May 2002.

Club statistics

References

External links

1974 births
Living people
Association football people from Shimane Prefecture
Japanese footballers
J1 League players
J2 League players
Japan Football League (1992–1998) players
Japan Football League players
FC Tokyo players
Tokyo Musashino United FC players
Association football midfielders